Algorithmic legal order may refer to:

 Government by algorithm
 Distributed ledger technology law